Santiago Apoala is a village and municipality in the state of Oaxaca, Mexico, located north  of Oaxaca city.  
It is part of the Nochixtlán District in the southeast of the Mixteca Region.

The name “apoala” is from Nahuatl meaning “water that destroys”. It is part of the Mixtec area of Oaxaca state and is also known by its Mixtec name of “Yutatnoho” which means “river where the lords come from”. Its foundation date is unknown but local legends say this was one of the first areas settled by the Mixtecs.

There are two waterfalls nearby called Cascadas de Apoala and Cola de Serpiente (snake’s tail).

The municipality
As municipal seat, the village of Santiago Apoala has governing jurisdiction over the following communities:

Arriba de la Peña, Jazmín Morelos, San Antonio Nduayaco, Tierra Colorada, Unión Buena Vista (Yodocanit o Yodocani), and Unión Palo Solo

References

Municipalities of Oaxaca